There have been several designs for a peace flag.

The Peace Flag initiative 
"The Peace Flag" is an initiative that aims to unify all nations underneath one common symbol on International Peace Day.
While there are various icons of peace – the olive branch, the dove – there is no official world flag of peace adopted by the United Nations. That's why this initiative has proposed that, for one day a year on 21 September, every country raises an all-white version of their national flag to represent that we are all one. In 2013, embassies of Colombia, Equatorial Guinea and Ecuador in London officially agreed to support The Peace Flag initiative by raising a colorless version of their respective flags on 21 September. The initiative was nominated for a White Pencil in 2012 at D&AD for its contribution towards peace, in support of Peace One Day.

White-bordered national flag 

The white flag is recognized in most of the world as a flag of surrender, truce or ceasefire. The first mention of a white flag used in this context is made during the Eastern Han dynasty (AD 25–220). A white flag was also used by the anti-war movement during the US Civil War in 1861.

In 1891, the third Universal Peace Congress in Rome devised a generalized Peace Flag design, which was simply the home nation's flag bordered in white to signify non-violent conflict resolution. This was used (although not officially adopted) by the American Peace Society and the Universal Peace Union. It was designed by Henry Pettit.

The Pro Concordia Labor flag 

In the 1890s, expatriate American Cora Slocomb di Brazza Savorgnan, the Countess Di Brazzà, invented a universal peace flag with three upright bands: yellow, purple, and white, which became the peace flag of the International Peace Bureau. Originally, there was a complicated symbol on the middle band: "a shield ... surmounted by a man's and a woman's clasped hands, sustained by a pair of dove wings with a white star aloft; on the shield can appear any device chosen by the association adopting the flag, or simply the number of enrollment among the users of the flag, or the motto Pro Concordia Labor (For Peace I Work), or this motto may be placed upon a ribbon on the flag beneath the shield, or on a streamer (white) from the flag staff (blue, the color of promise) surmounted by a star with the motto of the association or individual using the flag upon the other white streamer".

This flag was adopted by the International Council of Women in 1896. In 1904, it lost the complicated design and became a simple tricolor.

The Earth flag 

, a Methodist minister from Youngstown, Ohio designed the first world peace flag of the Earth, using rainbow stripes, stars and a globe. In 1913 and 1929, he made a peace tour through Europe with his flag. He traveled around the world arguing for "the brotherhood of man and the Fatherhood of God".

The Universal Peace Congress eventually came to adopt Kirk's flag as its official World Peace Flag, and it was subsequently adopted by the American Peace Society as well as other groups. It consisted of "the earth on a blue field covered with white stars; a white band crossed the globe and to the left was broken up into a spectrum representing the variations of the human race—different, but united in peace". The flag also shows 46 stars surrounding the globe and the spectrum.

In 1938, Kirk authored an autobiography, Stranger than fiction: four times around the world, designer of world flag, a world builder, at 80 years makes a new start in life.

The Banner of Peace 

The banner of peace is a symbol of the Roerich Pact. This pact was the first international treaty dedicated to the protection of artistic and scientific institutions and historical monuments. It was signed on 15 April 1935. The banner of peace was proposed by Nicholas Roerich for an international pact for the protection of culture values.

The Rainbow flag 
The most common recent design is a rainbow flag representing peace, first used in Italy at a peace march in 1961. The flag was inspired by similar multi-coloured flags used in demonstrations against nuclear weapons. A previous version had featured a dove drawn by Pablo Picasso.

The most common variety has seven colours—purple, blue, azure, green, yellow, orange, and red—and is emblazoned in bold with the Italian word PACE, meaning "peace".

It became popular with the Pace da tutti i balconi ("peace from every balcony") campaign in 2002, started as a protest against the impending invasion of Iraq. At that time its use was met with criticism from the Italian LGBT community for being too similar to the LGBT six-color gay pride flag (which was originally created in San Francisco California in 1979) and had started being used regularly in Italy a couple of years earlier during the 2000 inaugural WorldPride celebration in Rome. The flag was flown from balconies in all Italian cities by citizens against the war. Its use spread to other countries too, and the Italian Pace was sometimes, but not everywhere, replaced with the corresponding translation in the local languages.

According to Amnesty International, producer Franco Belsito had produced about 1,000 flags per year for 18 years, and suddenly had to cope with a demand in the range of the millions.

Common variations include moving the purple stripe down below the azure one, and adding a white stripe on top.

The seven-color peace flag is not to be confused with the similar six-color gay pride flag, which does not have azure, and has the colors in the opposite order with red at the top.

The largest peace flag 

The first large peace flag was made in Lecce, Salento, Italy by the association "GPace - Youth for peace" on Saturday, 14 November 2009. Three years later this record was broken. On 21 September 2012, the Belgian Peace Organisation in the historic center of Ghent. The action aimed to reinforce the demand to disarm in order to make room for sustainable development.

Gallery

See also 
 Peace symbols
 Peace movement
 White-blue-white flag (Russian anti-war flag)
 Flag of Earth
 Rainbow flag

References

Bibliography

External links 

 The Peace Flag
 Brotherhood Flag
 World Peace Service flag

Activism flags
Flag
Rainbow flags